Leahy-class cruisers were a class of guided-missile cruisers built for the United States Navy. They were originally designated as Destroyer Leaders (DLG), but in the 1975 cruiser realignment they were reclassified as guided-missile cruisers (CG).

They were a new "double-ender" class fitted with Terrier (later Standard ER) missile launchers fore and aft, and the first and only frigate class designed without a main gun battery for shore bombardment or ship-vs.-ship engagements—the gun armament was reduced in order to carry a larger missile load.

The ships carried over the propulsion plant of the Farragut class, fitted into a longer hull designed with a knuckled “hurricane” bow that reduced plunging in a rough sea, thus keeping the forecastle dry as needed to operate the forward missile launcher. Other features included an expanded electrical plant and increased endurance. A major design innovation was the use of "macks"—combined masts and stacks—on which the radars could be mounted without smoke interference.

Description
Designed under project SCB 172,  the first three ships were constructed at Bath Iron Works, the next two at New York Shipbuilding Corp, and the rest at Puget Sound Bridge and Dry Dock Company, Todd Shipyards, San Pedro, CA, San Francisco Naval Shipyard and Puget Sound Naval Shipyard.

Modernizations were accomplished between 1967 and 1972 under SCB 244, upgrading air warfare capabilities. Nearly all modernizations were completed at Bath Iron Works, but Leahy received the modernization at Philadelphia Naval Shipyard at a cost of $36.1 million.

All Leahy-class ships were modernized again in the late 1980s New Threat Upgrade program. This program added advanced air search and track radars (AN/SPS-49 and AN/SPS-48E), updated targeting radars (AN/SPG-55), and combat direction systems. The upgrade included massive remodeling of the ship from food service space rehabilitation to a main propulsion system overhaul. Entire systems were removed and replaced, for example the AN/SPS-40 air-search radar was replaced with the AN/SPS-49 air-search radar. The upgrade was also quite expensive and the ships didn't serve much longer after the modification. For example, USS Gridley (CG-21) received NTU in 1991 at a cost of $55 million, but was decommissioned in early 1994.

The Leahy class (and near sisters of the ) were taken out of service in the early 1990s as part of the Clinton Administration's desire to reduce defense spending in light of reduced tensions with Russia. The entire class was decommissioned between 1993 and 1995, stricken from the naval register, and transferred to the Maritime Administration (MARAD) for disposal.

USS Bainbridge

USS Bainbridge (CGN-25) was a nuclear-powered development of the Leahy-class. Originally a guided-missile destroyer leader, the class was re-designated guided-missile cruiser in 1975. As with USS Long Beach (CGN-9) and USS Enterprise (CVN-65), Bainbridge was the only member of its single-ship class.

Bainbridge was largely identical to the Leahy class except for the replacement of the conventional design's four  steam boilers with two D2G reactors, and related increases in displacement, length and beam. Bainbridges engineering department carried 7 officers and 156 enlisted men—respectively 3 and 42 more than a contemporary steam-powered vessel.

Ships in class

Gallery

See also
List of United States Navy destroyer leaders
List of United States Navy cruisers

References

External links

Leahy-class frigates at Destroyer History Foundation

Cruiser classes